Daber is a small settlement in the Municipality of Tolmin in the Littoral region of Slovenia. It lies on a plateau above the valley of the Idrijca River. It includes the hamlet of Nart.

Name
The name Daber is believed to derive from the Slovene common noun debèr 'ravine'. If so, it is related to names like Deber (a neighborhood of Augsdorf in Velden am Wörther See, Austria), Dabar (in Croatia), and Debar (in North Macedonia).

References

External links 

Daber on Geopedia

Populated places in the Municipality of Tolmin